Vazivar (also Romanized as Vāzīvār and Vāzīvar) is a village in Kalej Rural District, in the Central District of Nowshahr County, Mazandaran Province, Iran. At the 2006 census, its population was 476, in 129 families.

References 

Populated places in Nowshahr County